Anita Rita Kenyo (born 21 November 1981) is a road cyclist from Hungary. She represented her nation at the 2011 UCI Road World Championships.

References

External links
 profile at Procyclingstats.com

1985 births
Hungarian female cyclists
Living people
Place of birth missing (living people)